Dakota Growers Pasta Company is an American brand of pasta and food processing, currently owned by 8th Avenue, a company of Post Holdings. The former Dakota Growers agricultural processing company was located in Carrington, North Dakota, having started in 1990 as a wheat-growers cooperative. In 2002, Dakota Growers became a public company.

Announced as a joint press release on March 10, 2010, 'Dakota Growers Pasta Company' was sold to the Canadian-based agribusiness Viterra, Inc. Following Viterra's acquisition by Glencore Xstrata, Dakota Growers was sold to Post Holdings on January 1, 2014.

Television 
Vice President David Tressler and the plant were featured on the Food Network show Unwrapped. The episode focused on the manufacture of Dakota Growers Pasta's Dreamfields low-carb pasta line.

Products
dry pasta
semolina
durum wheat
mill feed by-products

References

External links
 Official website (archived, 2 Feb 2010)
Unwrapped YouTube video
 Dakota Growers Pasta Company, Inc (Google Maps)

Food manufacturers of the United States
American pasta companies
Manufacturing companies based in North Dakota
Carrington, North Dakota
American companies established in 1990
Food and drink companies established in 1990
1990 establishments in North Dakota
Post Consumer Brands brands
Agricultural cooperatives in the United States
d